Mawaan Rizwan (born 18 August 1992) is a Pakistani-born British actor, writer and comedian who began his career as a YouTuber.

Early life 
Rizwan was born in Lahore, Pakistan; his mother, Shahnaz, was one of nine siblings and had starred in a number of black and white Pakistani films. As his mother desired a better life for Mawaan and his sister, they emigrated to London in 1994. Six years later, at the age of eight, Rizwan and his family were threatened with deportation, but were granted indefinite leave to remain after legal battles and protests for the family's immigration rights.

Career 
Rizwan started making YouTube videos at the age of 16. The attention he received for these resulted in him gaining roles on various television and streaming programming. In 2013 he began starring in the BAFTA award nominated series DNN: Definitely Not Newsround, a spoof news comedy series for children. In 2015 he starred in Disney XD UK series Mega Awesome Super Hacks alongside Oli White and Jimmy Hill.

In 2015, Rizwan travelled to Pakistan, his country of birth, to film the documentary How Gay Is Pakistan? which explores the issues faced by other LGBTQ Muslims living under Islamic law that deems homosexuality illegal. The documentary was televised internationally, including on ABC2 in Australia, CBC in Canada and in various markets via Amazon Prime Video.

Rizwan's career in stand-up comedy began in 2010 when he performed his first gig at a basement venue in Leicester Square. He performed at the Edinburgh Festival Fringe, with his 2018 and 2019 performances gaining positive reviews from critics.  In 2018, Rizwan participated in a charity benefit event called Choose Laughs? at the Playhouse Theatre to support the NGO Help Refugees.

In 2019, it was announced that Rizwan would be starring in the upcoming comedy series Two Weeks to Live for Sky One, due to be aired in 2020. April 2019 also saw Rizwan release his first two singles – "I've Got a New Walk" and "Mango" – with a third single, "Never Been Skiing", released in September. Forbes named Rizwan one of their '30 under 30' movers for their 2020 list, after recognition for being a writer on Netflix series Sex Education as well as his role in BBC Three drama Murdered by My Father and opening for Queer Eye's Jonathan Van Ness on tour.

In September 2020 he appeared in Jonathan Ross's Comedy Club as co-host, and on 15 October 2020, Rizwan appeared in the 10th series of Taskmaster, finishing 3rd.

Personal life 
Rizwan is gay, having come out to his traditional Muslim parents at the age of 24. In 2014, he appeared alongside his mother, Shahnaz, in a YouTube video which resulted in his mother gaining the attention of Bollywood and eventually landing a role in the Indian television series Yeh Hai Mohabbatein (This Is Love).

Mawaan's brother, Nabhaan, also followed the family into a career in acting with his debut in BBC drama series Informer.

Filmography

Television

Film

Screenwriter

References

External links 
 

Living people
1992 births
British male actors of South Asian descent
Entertainers from London
English Muslims
English television presenters
Pakistani emigrants to England
People from Ilford
People from Lahore
Pakistani LGBT comedians
Pakistani gay actors
Pakistani gay writers
Gay Muslims
Gay comedians
English LGBT comedians
English gay writers
English gay actors
LGBT film directors
LGBT YouTubers
20th-century Pakistani LGBT people
21st-century Pakistani LGBT people
20th-century English LGBT people
21st-century English LGBT people